Cabada is a Spanish surname, prevalent in Mexico and the United States.

Notable people
Notable people with this surname include:
 Ángel Rosario Cabada (1872–1921), Mexican agrarian leader
 Fernando Cabada Jr. (born 1982), Mexican-American distance runner
 Héctor Armando Cabada Alvídrez, Mexican politician
 Javier Cabada (born 1931), Spanish-American artist
 Marina Garay Cabada (born 1953), Mexican politician
 Moisés Cabada (born 1985), Peruvian footballer

References